Homoeoneuria is a genus of brushleg mayflies in the family Oligoneuriidae. There are at least 5 described species in Homoeoneuria.

Species
 Homoeoneuria alleni Pescador and Peters, 1980
 Homoeoneuria ammophila (Spieth, 1938)
 Homoeoneuria cahabensis Pescador and Peters, 1980
 Homoeoneuria dolani Edmunds, Berner and Traver, 1958
 Homoeoneuria salviniae Eaton, 1881

References

 McCafferty, W. P. / Robert W. Poole and Patricia Gentili, eds. (1997). "Ephemeroptera". Nomina Insecta Nearctica: A Check List of the Insects of North America, vol. 4: Non-Holometabolous Orders, 89 - 118.

Further reading

External links

 NCBI Taxonomy Browser, Homoeoneuria

Mayfly genera